Douyé (pronounced Doe-Yay) is a Lagos, Nigerian born jazz vocalist who now lives in Los Angeles, California. She has released four albums; the first two recordings were R&B, but she made the change to jazz for her third album to honor her dying father's request to her when she was a child, which was to sing jazz. The fourth album is jazz interpretation of bossa nova and samba music.

Early life 
As a youngster growing up in Lagos, Douyé was interested in the American music of Billie Holiday, Sarah Vaughn, Ray Charles, Ella Fitzgerald, and Frank Sinatra. She started writing poems, and eventually songs that she started singing at the age of five. Encouraged by her father, Landy Youduba, Douyé joined a local church choir.

After a stay in London, she moved to Los Angeles to attend the Musicians Institute in Hollywood as a vocal major and there she became interested in recording R&B music.

Career 
At the Musicians Institute, Douyé met songwriter Terry Shaddick, who wrote Olivia Newton-John’s multi-platinum hit, "Physical." Shaddick and Douyé collaborated on songs that became her debut album, Journey, in 2007.

So Much Love was her second R&B album, and featured elements of jazz and reggae. All of the songs were co-written, once again, by Douyé and Shaddick, with fellow Nigerian Dapo Torimiro contributing on a number of cuts. Guitarist/producer Chris Sholar and jazz keyboardist/producer Philippe Saisse also made appearances on the album. The lead track was dedicated to Nigeria’s well-known musician, Fela Anikulapo Kuti. So Much Love was mixed by Ray Bardani and mastered by Bernie Grundman.

So Much Love was called by the Baltimore Times: "13 of the most soulful songs you will ever hear." A song from that album, "Life Is Good," produced by Torimiro, climbed to No. 9 on the UK soul chart.

After the two R&B albums, Douyé released Daddy Said So, a jazz album. Her father had insisted she try the genre in her career, a request he made to her when she was 11 and he was on his death bed. As a result, she began performing in jazz jams at the World Stage in Los Angeles, before recording the album.

Daddy Said So features well-established jazz musicians including Ron Carter, Russell Malone, Kenny Barron, Roy McCurdy, John Beasley, John Clayton, and many more.

"Douyé's first jazz record is substantial," reviewed All About Jazz. The album remained on the JazzWeek Airplay chart for 26 weeks.

On 5 April 2019, Douyé released Quatro (Bossa Nova Deluxe) an album of Brazilian and African jazz interpretations of '50s and '60s bossa nova and samba music. The styling expansion was the result of a visit Douyé took to Bahia, Brazil, where she was influenced by the African people and customs of the Brazilian people of Bahia.

Quatro (Bossa Nova Deluxe) has 16 tracks, and features many contributing musicians. Pianist John di Martino (Jon Hendricks, Pat Martino), Brazilian drummer Duduka Da Fonseca, bassist Boris Kozlov (Mingus Big Band), and percussionist Manolo Badrena (Weather Report, Ahmad Jamal) all perform on Jobim’s "How Insensitive." Jed Levy plays flute on "Summer Samba (So Nice)." Additionally, drummer Zack O'Farrill contributed on "Agua De Beber", along with trumpeter David Adewumi, on Horace Silver’s "Nica’s Dream," and Jobim's "One Note Samba." Bassist Phil Small joins the large ensemble on a rendition of "Lover Man".

Brazilian guitarist Angelo Metz contributes four Jobim boss nova-style classics including "Triste," “Corcovado," “Wave," and "Girl From Ipanema." His quartet includes Venezuelan pianist Otmaro Ruiz and Colombian saxophonist/flutist Justo Almario (Mongo Santamaria). Drummer Evan Hyde plays on "Watch What Happens;" pianist Mike Eckroth adds "Once I Loved" that also features a flugelhorn solo by Freddie Hendrix; Brazilian guitarists Marcel Camargo and Romero Lumbarbo pair with Douyé on "Desafinado" and "Dindi," respectively. Brazilian jazz guitarist Romero Lumbardo arranged, produced and performed "Dindi", and soloed on "Blue Bossa".

Quatro was voted as one of the best New Releases in the JazzTimes 2019 Reader's Poll. The album placed at number 18 on The Roots Music Report'''s Top Jazz Album Chart for the year 2019.

 Discography 
 Journey (2008)
 So Much Love (2014)
 Daddy Said So (2017)
 Quatro (Bossa Nova Deluxe)'' (2019)

References

External links 
 

21st-century Nigerian women singers
1969 births
Nigerian jazz singers
Living people